The École Nationale Supérieure de Biologie Appliquée à la Nutrition et à l'Alimentation or ENSBANA was a French "Ecole d'Ingénieurs" (Grande Ecole) specialised in Food Science and Technology, located on the campus of Université de Bourgogne, Dijon, France.
Since it was founded in 1967, more than 1,800 students have graduated from the school.
It merged with ENSESAD to create Agrosup Dijon in 2009.
Since 2022, Agrosup Dijon became : Institut Agro Dijon.

Curriculum
 Chemistry, Biochemistry
 Food Technology and Food Processing
 Sensory Analysis
 Nutrition
 Microbiology and Biotechnology
 Food Safety, Hygiene, Toxicology and Quality Assurance
 Applied Mathematics, Economics, Foreign Languages

External links
 Institut Agro Dijon
 Association des Ingénieurs de l'ENS.BANA
 Conférence des Grandes Ecoles

Dijon
Educational institutions established in 1967